Arende, also known as Cape Rebel, was a television mini-series and historical drama about the Second Boer War, as experienced by two fictional characters: Sloet Steenkamp (played by Ian Roberts), a rebellious Boer farmer, and James Kerwin (played by Gavin van den Berg), a Captain with the British Army.

TV mini-series 
The first season comprising 10 episodes was first aired on 27 April 1989 on the SABC.  The second season titled "Arende II: MoordenaarsKaroo " comprising 10 episodes was first aired on 13 February 1992 and the third and final season titled Arende III: Dorsland was first air on 28 October 1993 and comprised 13 episodes.  The show was run on SABC 1 in South Africa and syndicated abroad under the name Cape Rebel.

Movie 
A film version of Arende also starring Ian Roberts as Sloet Steenkamp and Gavin van den Berg as Captain James Kerwin was released in 1994.  The movie follows Sloet Steenkamp as he fights the British invasion and is subsequent capture and imprisonment on Saint Helena Island.

References

External links
 : mini-series
 : 1994 movie

1980s South African television series
1990s South African television series
Television shows set in Africa
Television shows set in South Africa
South African television miniseries
History of South Africa
1994 South African television series endings
Television series set in the 1890s
Television series set in the 1900s
1989 South African television series debuts